Wylie is a surname. Notable people with the surname include:

 Adam Wylie, (born 1984), American actor, singer and performer
 Alexander Wylie (disambiguation), multiple people
 Alison Wylie, Canadian feminist philosopher of science at the University of Washington, Seattle (Winter and Spring) and Durham University, UK (Fall)
 Andrew Wylie, first president of Indiana University
 Andrew Wylie (literary agent), American literary agent
 Austin Wylie (1893–1954), American jazz bandleader
 Ben Wylie, Irish cricketer
 Betty Jane Wylie (born 1931), Canadian writer and playwright
 Bill Wylie (1928–1983), Canadian professional ice hockey centre who played in one National Hockey League game for the New York Rangers during the 1950–51 NHL season
 Bob Wylie (born 1954), American football coach who is currently the offensive line coach for the Winnipeg Blue Bombers of the Canadian Football League
 Chalmers Wylie (1920–1998), American politician and lawyer
 Charles Hotham Montagu Doughty-Wylie (1868–1915), British Army officer
 Charles Wylie (astronomer) (1886–1976), born in Ida Kansas on June 18, 1886, and died in Cedar Rapids Iowa in April 1976
 Donovan Wylie (born 1971), Irish photographer from Northern Ireland
 Drew Wylie, Irish Gaelic footballer
 Duane Wylie (born 1950), former Canadian ice hockey center
 Elinor Wylie (1885–1928), American poet and novelist
 Fannie B. Wylie, American politician
 Sir Francis James Wylie (1865–1952), British academic literary critic
 Sir Francis Verner Wylie (1891–1970), British civil servant in India
 Gordon Wylie, Scottish footballer
 Graham Wylie, founder of the Sage Group
 Harvey Wylie (born 1934), former defensive back who played nine seasons in the Canadian Football League for the Calgary Stampeders
 Henry Wylie (1844–1918), British administrator and diplomat
 Ida Alexa Ross Wylie (1885–1959), Australian/British/American writer
 James Aitken Wylie, Scottish historian
 Jenny Wylie (born 1957), American former competition swimmer
 Joe Wylie (born 1968), American retired professional basketball player
 Lauri Wylie (1880–1951), British author
 Mike Wylie, Australian rugby league footballer
 Mina Wylie (1891–1984), Australian swimmer
 Norman Wylie (1923–2005), Scottish politician
 Paul Wylie (born 1964), American figure skater
 Pete Wylie (born 1958), English singer/songwriter and guitarist
 Philip Gordon Wylie (1902–1971), American writer
 Richard "Popcorn" Wylie (1939–2008), American R&B pianist, songwriter and record producer
 Robert Wylie (1839–1877), American artist
 Ron Wylie (1933–2020), Scottish football player, coach and manager
 Ruth Shaw Wylie (1916–1989), U.S.-born composer and music educator
 Ryan Wylie, Irish Gaelic footballer
 Sharon Wylie (born 1949), American politician of the Democratic Party. She is a member of the Washington House of Representatives, representing the 49th district
 Shaun Wylie (1913–2009), British mathematician
 Sofia Wylie (born 2004), American actress and dancer
 Theophilus Adam Wylie (1810–1895), Presbyterian minister, college professor, and president pro tem of Indiana University
 Turrell V. Wylie (1927–1984), American Tibetologist and sinologist
 William Duncan Wylie (1900–1981), farmer, public servant and Canadian federal politician
 William Howie Wylie (1833–1891), Scottish journalist and Baptist minister
 Willard Otis Wylie (1862–1944), of Boston, Massachusetts, USA
 William M. Wylie (1928–2006), American politician, farmer, and businessman

See also
 Wiley (disambiguation)
 Wylie (disambiguation)
 Wyly
 Wyle (disambiguation)

English-language surnames